Admiral Macdonald may refer to:

Bruce E. MacDonald (born 1955), U.S. Navy vice admiral
Reginald Macdonald (1820–1899), British Royal Navy admiral
Roderick Douglas Macdonald (1921–2001), British Royal Navy vice admiral